John Bisley may refer to:

John Bisley (fl. 1382–1391), MP for Gloucester
John Bisley (fl. 1406–1421), MP for Gloucester